Veerappa Nayaka is a 1999 Indian Kannada-language biographical film, directed by S. Narayan, starring Vishnuvardhan and Shruti. It is a story of a Gandhian's son turning into a terrorist. This was also the first film in Vishnuvardhan and Narayan's combination and the movie ran for 50 weeks at the box office.

Plot

The story is about Veerappanayaka, a Gandhian whose son turns into a terrorist.

Cast
Vishnuvardhan
Shruthi
Hema Choudhary
Saurav
Shobraj 
Kote Prabhakar 
Renuka prasad 
Bhavani Shankar 
Agro Chikkanna 
Bhavyashree Rai 
Ashalatha 
Renukamma Murugod 
Bank suresh 
Fayaz Khan 
 Sudheer
 Renuka Prasad

Soundtrack
Music for the film was composed by Rajesh Ramanath.

Reception 
A critic from Deccan Herald opined that "The film is truly worthy of the weavers of our national tricolour!" The New Indian Express wrote, "This film may remain as one of the best films of Vishnuvardhan’s career. With his mature acting, the film’s story has been handled with the right touch. He never indulges in overacting".

References

External links

1999 films
Films about terrorism in India
1990s Kannada-language films
Films directed by S. Narayan
Films scored by Rajesh Ramnath